In algebra, an augmentation ideal is an ideal that can be defined in any group ring. 

 is generated by the differences  of group elements.

For R and G as above, the group ring R[G] is an example of an augmented R-algebra. Such an algebra comes equipped with a ring homomorphism to R.  The kernel of this homomorphism is the augmentation ideal of the algebra.

The augmentation ideal plays a basic role in group cohomology, amongst other applications.

Examples of quotients by the augmentation ideal
 Let G a group and  the group ring over the integers. Then the quotient  is isomorphic to the abelianization of G, defined as the quotient of G by its commutator subgroup. 
 A complex representation V of a group G is a  - module.
 Another class of examples of augmentation ideal can be the kernel of the counit  of any Hopf algebra.

Notes

References
 
Dummit and Foote, Abstract Algebra

Ideals (ring theory)
Hopf algebras